Witte (and de Witte) are Dutch and Low German surnames meaning "(the) white one".  Witte can also be a patronymic surname. Notable people with the surname include:

 Alfred Witte (1878–1941), German astrologer
 Carla Witte (1889–1943), German-Uruguayan painter, sculptor and teacher
 Dave Witte, American drummer
 Earl Witte (1906–1991), American football player
 Edwin E. Witte (1887–1960), American economist, "father of social security"
 Els Witte (born 1941), Belgian historian
 Erich Witte (1911–2008), German stage actor, operatic tenor and opera director
 George Witte (21st-century), American poet
 Helmut Witte (1915–2005), German U-boat commander
 Herman Witte (1909–1973), Dutch engineer and politician
 Jean Carlo Witte (born 1977), Brazilian football (soccer) player
 Jerry Witte (1915–2002), American baseball player
 Joe Witte (born 1943), American weatherman
 John Witte (1933–1993), American football player
 John Witte, Jr. (born 1959), Canadian-American legal scholar
 Karl Witte (1800–1883), German jurist and Dante Alighieri scholar
 Laura Witte (1869–1939), American-born suffragette active in Germany
 Les Witte (1911–1973), American college basketball player
 Luke Witte (born 1950), American basketball player
 Michael Witte (born 1944), American-born illustrator and cartoonist
 Otto Witte (1872–1958), German circus acrobat
 Philip Witte (born 1984), German field hockey player
 Russ Witte (born 1916/7), American swimmer
 Sergei Witte (1849–1915), Russian policy-maker
 Terry L. Witte (born 1952), American attorney and politician
 William Witte FRSE (1907–1992), Slovak-British scholar of German language and literature
 William Henry Witte (1817–1876), American politician

As a given name
 Witte van Haemstede (c. 1281 – 1321), Dutch nobility, son of Floris V, Count of Holland
 Witte de With (1599–1658), Dutch naval officer

Other
 Witte Museum
 Witte Automotive

See also
 Witt (disambiguation)

Dutch-language surnames
Low German surnames
Jewish surnames